Luke Isaiah Nelson (born 29 June 1995) is a British basketball player for the London Lions of the British Basketball League (BBL) and EuroCup. He also represents the Great Britain national team in international competitions. He played American college basketball for UC Irvine, where he was named the 2017 Big West Conference Player of the Year.

Nelson, a point guard born in London and raised in Worthing, first played basketball for the Worthing Thunder junior program, Followed by spending his later teenage years at Henley College whilst Playing with the Reading Rockets Division 1 team alongside playing for several England and Great Britain squads in the U16, U18 and U20 age groups in FIBA tournaments. He was named British player of the year in his age group for three consecutive seasons.

He attended college at the University of California, Irvine, where he became a four-year starter. He was named first-team All-Big West Conference in his junior and senior seasons and was named Big West Player of the Year as a senior.

Nelson helped UC Irvine to its first ever NCAA Tournament appearance in 2015 and help guided the Anteaters to a program record 28 wins in 2016. For all 4 seasons at UC Irvine, Nelson helped the team make a postseason appearance of some kind. He finished his collegiate career 4th in made threes (204), fifth in assists (361) and eighth in steals (115) and played in the collegiate All Star Game at the 2017 Final Four.

After going undrafted in the 2017 NBA draft after playing in the NBA Summer League with the Los Angeles Clippers, Nelson signed his first professional contract with Herbalife Gran Canaria in Spain's Liga ACB and EuroCup competition. He was sent to Real Betis Energía Plus on loan prior to the start of the season.

On 15 November 2019 he signed with Baxi Manresa of the Spanish Liga ACB.

On 30 July 2020 he signed with BG Göttingen of the Basketball Bundesliga.

On 16 July 2021 he signed with ESSM Le Portel of the French LNB Pro A.

International career
Nelson has competed for the Great Britain senior national team since graduating college and is usually the starting shooting guard on the squad  during competition.

References

External links
Luke Nelson at acb.com 
UC Irvine Anteaters bio
FIBA profile

1995 births
Living people
Basketball players from Greater London
Bàsquet Manresa players
BG Göttingen players
British expatriate basketball people in Germany
British expatriate basketball people in Spain
British expatriate basketball people in the United States
British men's basketball players
English expatriate sportspeople in Germany
English expatriate sportspeople in Spain
English expatriate sportspeople in the United States
English men's basketball players
ESSM Le Portel players
Liga ACB players
Point guards
Real Betis Baloncesto players
Shooting guards
Sportspeople from Worthing
UC Irvine Anteaters men's basketball players